Harari People's Democratic Party is a political party in the Harari Region, Ethiopia.

References

Ethnic political parties in Ethiopia
Political parties in Ethiopia